Charles Farr may refer to:

 Charles Farr (builder) (c. 1812–1888), Australian timber merchant and builder
 Charles Farr (civil servant) (1959–2019), British civil servant, intelligence officer, and diplomat